The Big Blues is a compilation album by Albert King, released by King Records in 1962. It is his first album and the only one before he signed with Stax Records, where he would record most albums during his career. The album was later reissued under the title Travelin' to California.

Recording 
The Big Blues compiles songs previously released by King Records and Bobbin Records as singles and B-sides. King recorded "Blues at Sunrise" and "Let's Have a Natural Ball" for the St. Louis label Bobbin in 1960, which helped to introduce him to a wider audience.

In October 1961, King released "Don't Throw Your Love on Me So Strong", which included Ike Turner on piano. It did so well locally that King Records leased the record from Bobbin and released it as a single the next month. It became King's first appearance on the charts, peaking at number 14 on the Billboard R&B chart.

Track listing 
All songs were written by Albert King, except where noted.

Side 1
 "Let's Have a Natural Ball" – 2:52
 "What Can I Do to Change Your Mind?" – 2:48
 "I Get Evil" – 2:26
 "Had You Told It Like It Was (It Wouldn't Be Like It Is)" (Sonny Thompson, Gene Redd) – 2:59
 "This Morning" – 2:10
 "I Walked All Night Long" – 2:51

Side 2
 "Don't Throw Your Love on Me So Strong" – 2:55
 "Travelin' to California" – 3:00
 "I've Made Nights by Myself" – 2:34
 "This Funny Feeling" (Rudy Toombs) – 2:32
 "Ooh-Ee Baby" – 3:52
 "Dyna Flow" – 2:50

Personnel 
 Albert King – guitar, vocals
 Ike Turner – piano on "Don't Throw Your Love On Me So Strong"
 Additional unknown musicians
 Pierre Wooten – cover illustration

References 

1962 debut albums
Albert King albums
King Records (United States) albums